Cuisine of the Indian subcontinent includes the cuisines from the Indian subcontinent comprising the traditional cuisines from Bangladesh, Bhutan, India, the Maldives, Nepal, Pakistan and Sri Lanka.

Staples and common ingredients 

Chapati, a type of flat bread, is a common part of meals to be had in many parts of Indian subcontinent. Other staples from many of the cuisines include rice, roti made from atta flour, and beans.

Foods in this area of the world are flavoured with various types of chilli, black pepper, cloves, and other strong herbs and spices along with the flavoured butter ghee. Ginger is an ingredient that can be used in both savory and sweet recipes in cuisines from the Indian subcontinent. Chopped ginger is fried with meat and pickled ginger is often an accompaniment to boiled rice. Ginger juice and ginger boiled in syrup are used to make desserts. Turmeric and cumin are often used to make curries.

Common meats include lamb, goat, fish, chicken and beef. Beef is less common in India than in other South Asian cuisines because cattle have a special place in Hinduism. Prohibitions against beef extend to the meat of (water) buffalo and yaks to some extent. Pork is considered as a taboo food item by all Muslims and is avoided by many Hindus, though it is commonly eaten in some regions like Northeast India and Goa.  A variety of very sweet desserts which use dairy products is also found in cuisines of the Indian subcontinent. The main ingredients in desserts of the Indian subcontinent are reduced milk, ground almonds, lentil flour, ghee and sugar. Kheer is a dairy-based rice pudding, a common dessert.

History 

Many foods from the Indian subcontinent have been known for over five thousand years. The Indus Valley people, who settled in what is now the northwestern Indian subcontinent, hunted turtles and alligator. They also collected wild grains, herbs and plants. Many foods and ingredients from the Indus period (c. 3300–1700 B.C.) are still common today. Some consist of wheat, barley, rice, tamarind, eggplant, and cucumber. The Indus Valley people cooked with oils, ginger, salt, green peppers, and turmeric root, which would be dried and ground into an orange powder.

Indians have used leafy vegetables, lentils, and milk products such as yogurt and ghee throughout their history. They also used spices such as cumin and coriander. Black pepper, which is native to India, was often used by 400 A.D. The Greeks brought saffron and the Chinese introduced tea. The Portuguese and British made red chili, potato and cauliflower popular after 1700 A.D. Mughals, who began arriving in India after 1200, saw food as an art and many of their dishes are cooked with as many as 25 spices. They also used rose water, cashews, raisins, and almonds.

In the late 18th and early 19th century, an autobiography of the Scottish Robert Lindsay mentions a Sylheti man called Saeed Ullah cooking a curry for Lindsay's family. This is possibly the oldest record of Indian cuisine in the United Kingdom.

By culture

Bangladeshi cuisine

Bangladeshi cuisine is dominated by Bengali cuisine and has been shaped by the diverse history and riverine geography of Bangladesh. The country has a tropical monsoon climate. Rice is the main staple food of Bangladeshi people and it is served with a wide range of curries.
 Bangladeshi dishes exhibit strong aromatic flavours; and often include eggs, potatoes, tomatoes and aubergines. A variety of spices and herbs, along with mustard oil and ghee, is used in Bangladeshi cooking. The main breads are naan, porota, roti, bakarkhani and luchi. Dal is the second most important staple food which is served with rice/porota/luchi. Fish is a staple in Bangladeshi cuisine, especially freshwater fish, which is a distinctive feature of the country's gastronomy. Major fish dishes include ilish (hilsa), pabda (butterfish), rui (rohu), pangash (pangas catfish), chitol (clown knifefish), magur (walking catfish), bhetki (barramundi) and tilapia. Meat consumption includes beef, lamb, venison, chicken, duck, squab and koel. Vegetable dishes, either mashed (bhorta), boiled (sabji), or leaf-based (saag), are widely served. Seafood such as lobsters and shrimps are also often prevalent.

Islamic dietary laws are prevalent across Bangladesh. Halal foods are food items that Muslims are allowed to eat and drink under Islamic dietary guidelines. The criteria specifies both what foods are allowed, and how the food must be prepared. The foods addressed are mostly types of meat allowed in Islam. Bangladeshi people follow certain rules and regulations while eating. It includes warm hospitality and particular ways of serving as well. This is known as Bangaliketa. The culture also defines the way to invite people to weddings and for dinner. Gifts are given on certain occasions. Bangaliketa also includes a way of serving utensils in a proper manner. Bengali cuisine has the only traditionally developed multi-course tradition from the subcontinent that is analogous in structure to the modern service à la russe style of French cuisine, with food served course-wise rather than all at once.

Bhutanese cuisine

Bhutanese cuisine employs a lot of red rice (like brown rice in texture, but with a nutty taste, the only variety of rice that grows at high altitudes), buckwheat, and increasingly maize. The diet in the hills also includes chicken, yak meat, dried beef, pork, pork fat, and mutton. It has many similarities with Tibetan cuisine

Indian cuisine

Indian cuisine is characterized by its sophisticated and subtle use of many Indian spices. There is also the widespread practice of vegetarianism across its society although, overall a minority. Indian cuisine is one of the world's most diverse cuisines, each family of this cuisine is characterized by a wide assortment of dishes and cooking techniques. As a consequence, Indian cuisine varies from region to region, reflecting the varied demographics of the ethnically diverse Indian subcontinent. India's religious beliefs and culture has played an influential role in the evolution of its cuisine. It has influences from Middle Eastern cuisine, Southeast Asian cuisine, East Asian cuisine and Central Asian cuisine, as well as the Mediterranean cuisines due to the historical and contemporary cross-cultural interactions with these neighboring regions.

Regional cuisine includes:

 East Indian cuisines:
 Cuisine of Chhattisgarh
 Odia cuisine
 Bhojpuri cuisine

 Northeast Indian cuisines:
 Bengali cuisine
 Assamese cuisine
 Arunachalese cuisine
 Meghalayan cuisine
 Manipuri cuisine
 Naga cuisine
 Mizo cuisine
 Sikkimese cuisine
 Tripuri cuisine
 Gorkha cuisine
 Jharkhandi cuisine
 Maithil cuisine
 Bihari cuisine
 Bhojpuri cuisine

 North Indian cuisines:
 Awadhi cuisine
 Cuisine of Uttar Pradesh
 Himachali cuisine
 Kashmiri cuisine
 Kumaoni cuisine
 Ladakhi cuisine
 Mughlai cuisine
 Punjabi cuisine
 Rajasthani cuisine

 South Indian cuisines:
 Chettinad cuisine
 Dhivehi cuisine (Minicoy)
 Hyderabadi cuisine
 Kerala cuisine
 Karnataka cuisine
 Mangalorean cuisine
 Tamil cuisine
 Telugu cuisine
 Thalassery cuisine
 Udupi cuisine

 West Indian cuisines:
 Goan cuisine
 Gujarati cuisine
 Maharashtrian cuisine
 Malvani cuisine
 Parsi cuisine
 Sindhi cuisine
 Thathai Bhatia Cuisine

 Other Indian cuisines include:
 Indian Chinese cuisine
 Jain vegetarianism
 Indian fast food

Maldivian cuisine

Maldivian cuisine, also called Dhivehi cuisine, is the cuisine of the Nation of Maldives and of Minicoy, India. The traditional cuisine of Maldivians is based on three main items and their derivatives: coconuts, fish and starches.

Nepalese cuisine

Nepalese cuisine comprises a variety of cuisines based upon ethnicity, soil and climate relating to Nepal's cultural diversity and geography.Dal-bhat-tarkari is eaten throughout Nepal.Nepali cuisine has significant influences from Neighboring Indian and Tibetan cuisines.

Nepalese cuisine includes:

 Newa cuisine
 Tibetan cuisine
 Maithil cuisine

Pakistani cuisine

Pakistani cuisine is part of the greater South Asian and Central Asian Cuisines due to its geographic location and influence. As a result of Mughal legacy, Pakistan also mutually inherited many recipes and dishes from that era alongside India.

Regional cuisines include:
 Balochi cuisine
 Chitrali cuisine
 Kalash cuisine
 Lahori cuisine
 Cuisine of Karachi
 Pashtun cuisine
 Punjabi cuisine
 Saraiki cuisine
 Sindhi cuisine

Other Pakistani cuisine include:
 Pakistani Chinese cuisine
 Mughlai cuisine (Karachi)
 Pakistani fast food

Sri Lankan cuisine

Sri Lankan cuisine has been shaped by many historical, cultural, and other factors.  Foreign traders who brought new food items; influences from Malay cuisine and South Indian cuisine are evident.

See also
List of Asian cuisines

References

Kutchi cuisine